Eagletown is an unincorporated community and census-designated place in McCurtain County, Oklahoma, United States. The population was 528 at the 2010 census. Eagletown was an important town from 1834 to 1906, and after 1850, served as county seat for the Choctaw Nation's Eagle County. The town name was officially changed to "Eagle Town" in 1850, then changed to the present Eagletown in 1892. When Indian Territory was preparing to unite with Oklahoma Territory to form the new state of Oklahoma in 1906, Eagletown lost its county seat status and became just another unincorporated community in the new McCurtain County.

Demographics

History
Some white settlers had moved to the area near Mountain Fork River around the present Eagletown during the early 19th Century, when the area was known as Miller County, Arkansas. but a boundary change in the 1820s put this area into Indian Territory. The white settlers were forced to move elsewhere in order to resettle the Choctaw tribe from Mississippi. When the first Choctaws arrived in 1832, they found fields that had been cleared for farming and cabins that had housed the previous inhabitants. As required by treaty, the Army established a feeding point here for the distribution of rations. An estimated 852 people were receiving rations here in April 1832. By 1834, the number of people here had grown by 1,500.

The Choctaws invited some of the white missionaries to join them in the move to Indian Territory. The first of these was Rev. Loring S. Williams, who was sent by the American Board of Commissioners for Foreign Missions in 1832. By July 1832, Williams established a station he called Bethabara on the west bank of the Mountain Fork River. The crossing was marked by a very large cypress tree that was called "the oldest tree in Oklahoma", dating back to before the Christian Era. He organized the first church in Choctaw country in 1834 and opened a school the next year. He also obtained the authority to establish a post office in 1834, and served as the first postmaster. The post office and the town were then known as "Eagle Town."  The name of both was officially changed to "Eagletown" on December 16, 1892. Another missionary, Reverend Cyrus Byington, arrived in late 1835. Byington spent 31 years here, and was noted for translating both religious and secular materials into a written Choctaw language that he created. He established the Stockbridge Mission on the other (east) side of the river from Bethabara. He was most noted for producing the Dictionary of the Choctaw Language. Byington also supervised the adjacent Iyanubbi Female Seminary, a boarding school for Choctaw girls that operated from 1844 until 1861.

Eagletown soon became a trading center on the Military Trace, an 1820s wagon trail through Choctaw Country built to connect Fort Towson to other military forts in Arkansas. After the Choctaw Nation created and passed its constitution in 1850, Eagletown became the "courtground" (i. e., county seat) of the newly created Eagle County. Jefferson Gardner, a Choctaw trader, opened a general store in 1874 on the east bank of the river. In 1884, built an imposing house that is now on the National Register of Historic Places (NRHP). Gardner became principal chief of the Choctaw Nation, but lost his fortune shortly after his term ended in 1896.

After Oklahoma became a state, more white settlers moved into the former Choctaw territory. Eagle County had been abolished and superseded by McCurtain County at statehood. Some of the settlers became farmers, while others worked in the expanding timber industry. Choctaw Lumber Company (later Dierks Forests) built a camp in Eagletown to house the timberworkers. The company also built a railway-- the Texas, Oklahoma and Eastern Railroad-- that connected to its line in Arkansas.

The Texas, Oklahoma and Eastern Railroad laid a track from Valliant, Oklahoma to DeQueen, Arkansas in 1920. Many of the existing Eagleton businesses moved to new facilities near the new depot. Little remains of the old Eagle Town except the Gardner house.

Notable person
 Cyrus Byington - American missionary

Notes

External links
 Encyclopedia of Oklahoma History and Culture - Eagletown

References

Census-designated places in Oklahoma
Unincorporated communities in McCurtain County, Oklahoma
Unincorporated communities in Oklahoma
Populated places established in 1832
Pre-statehood history of Oklahoma
1832 establishments in Indian Territory